Cecil Carlton Hughson, (February 9, 1916 – August 6, 1993) was a Major League Baseball starting pitcher who played his entire career in the American League with the Boston Red Sox (1941–44, 1946–49). He batted and threw right-handed.

A native of Kyle, Texas, Hughson played collegiately at the University of Texas at Austin. He was a successful and competitive major league pitcher who was not averse to throwing close to batters, changing speeds by mixing a hard fastball with an overhand curveball. At the height of his career, arm and shoulder injuries threatened permanent disability and hastened his retirement.

Hughson enjoyed his best season in 1942, posting a 22–6 record with a 2.59 ERA, and also leading the league in victories, strikeouts (113), complete games (22), innings pitched (281.0) and batters faced (1150). In 1943, he won 12 games with 114 strikeouts and a 2.64 ERA, and again led the league in complete games (20). He also had his best year batting, posting career highs in hits, runs, doubles, walks, batting average and RBI's. He led the league in winning percentage (18-5,.783) and WHIP (9.43), and also had a career-best ERA of 2.26.

After serving in the military in 1945, he won 20 games in 1946, led the league in walks per nine innings (1.65), set a career high in strikeouts with 172, and completed 21 of 35 starts.  His several 1-0 shutouts led to an early pennant-clinching for the Red Sox.  But he fell to 12 wins in 1947, and finished his career when only 33 after two seasons in relief.

In an eight-year career, he posted a 96–54 won-lost record with 693 strikeouts and a 2.94 ERA in 1375.2 innings. His control was good enough for an effective 1.86 strikeout-to-walk ratio (693-to-372). He was an American League All-Star for three consecutive years (1942–44).

He was one of the first in the United States to raise Charolois cattle.  He served on the local school Board of Trustees in the 1950s where he was one who led the effort to integrate the public schools. In the 60s he developed part of his ranch into the Hughson Heights subdivision.

He died in San Marcos at age 77, and is buried in San Marcos Cemetery.  He was enshrined in the University of Texas Hall of Honor in 1970, the Texas Sports Hall of Fame in 1987, and the Boston Red Sox Hall of Fame in November 2002.

See also
 List of Major League Baseball annual strikeout leaders
 List of Major League Baseball annual wins leaders

External links

Cowboy on the Mound: The Tex Hughson Story
Interview with Tex Hughson conducted by Eugene Murdock on May 30, 1987, in San Marcos, Texas: Part 1, Part 2

1942 Al Mathewson Award (article)
American Heroes (profile)
Baseball Reference (career statistics and analysis)
San Marcos Natural Areas

American League All-Stars
American League strikeout champions
American League wins champions
Boston Red Sox players
Major League Baseball pitchers
1916 births
1993 deaths
Baseball players from Texas
Texas Longhorns baseball players
People from Buda, Texas
Austin Pioneers players